Johnson Branch may refer to:

Johnson Branch (Fox River), a stream in Missouri
Johnson Branch (Meramec River), a stream in Missouri